Honeybee is an unincorporated community in McCreary County, Kentucky, United States. Their post office closed in 1983.

A post office was established in the community in 1905. The place name Honeybee derives from the large populations of honey bees found in the area.

References

Unincorporated communities in McCreary County, Kentucky
Unincorporated communities in Kentucky